"Downtown" Eddie Brown (born August 6, 1966) is a former slotback in the Canadian Football League between 1990 & 2002. Brown played with eight CFL teams, and appeared in two Grey Cup championships with the Edmonton Eskimos, winning the 81st Grey Cup in 1993.

In 1995, he played for the Memphis Mad Dogs. In 1996, after the demise of the Memphis Mad Dogs, he re-signed with the Edmonton Eskimos. In 1999, he played for the BC Lions.

In total he caught 532 passes for 8663 yards in 160 career CFL games with 63 touchdowns. Eddie had 3 1,000 yard seasons, all with Edmonton, and was a CFL All-Star in 1996 as well as Western All-Star in 1996 and 1999. 

His shoestring catch in the snow of the 84th Grey Cup is considered to be one of the most memorable plays in Grey Cup history.

References

External links
Just Sports Stats
Renegades ink Eddie Brown (CBC.ca article)
ArenaFan stats
TotalFootballStats
CFLapedia stats

1966 births
Living people
American players of Canadian football
BC Lions players
Calgary Stampeders players
Canadian football wide receivers
Canadian football slotbacks
Edmonton Elks players
Iowa State Cyclones football players
Iowa Barnstormers players
Memphis Mad Dogs players
Montreal Alouettes players
Ottawa Renegades players
Ottawa Rough Riders players
Players of American football from Sacramento, California
Players of Canadian football from Sacramento, California
Sportspeople from Topeka, Kansas
Sacramento Surge players
Toronto Argonauts players